WR 93b is a Wolf-Rayet star in the constellation Scorpius, an extremely rare star on the WO oxygen sequence.  It appears near NGC 6357 in the tail of the scorpion.

Discovery
WR 93b was discovered in 2003 during a study of emission line stars from the AAO/UKST Southern Galactic Plane Hα Survey.  It was published as the fourth galactic WO class star in 1994.  This was too late to be included in the VIIth Wolf Rayet catalogue, but it is listed in an annex published in 2006.

It lies in the direction of the Galactic Center and is thought to be part of the Scutum-Crux spiral arm.  It is highly reddened and interstellar extinction causes it to be 6.5 magnitudes fainter at visual wavelengths than it otherwise would be.

Features
WR 93b, of spectral classification WO3, is one of the very few known oxygen-sequence Wolf-Rayet stars, just four in the Milky Way galaxy and six in external galaxies. It is a very small dense star, with a radius less than half of the sun's but with a mass nearly 10 solar masses. Very strong stellar winds, with a terminal velocity of 5,000 kilometers per second are causing WR 93b to lose /year. For comparison, the Sun loses (2-3) x 10−14 solar masses per year due to its solar wind, several hundred million times less than WR 93b.

Evolutionary status
WO Wolf-Rayet stars are the last evolutionary stage of the most massive stars before exploding as supernovae, possibly with a gamma-ray burst. It is very likely that WR 93b is on its last stages of nuclear fusion, near or beyond the end of helium burning. It has been calculated that WR 93b will explode as a supernova within 8,000 years.

See also
WR 102
WR 142
WR 30a
List of supernova candidates

References

Scorpius (constellation)
Wolf–Rayet stars
J17320330-3504323
Astronomical events in the near future